Josef Linhart (born 15 May 1944) is a Czechoslovak footballer. He competed in the men's tournament at the 1968 Summer Olympics.

References

External links
 

1944 births
Living people
Czech footballers
Czechoslovak footballers
Olympic footballers of Czechoslovakia
Footballers at the 1968 Summer Olympics
Sportspeople from Kladno
Association football defenders
SK Slavia Prague players